Karlan Laughton Ahearne-Grant (born 18 September 1997) is a professional footballer who plays as a forward for  club West Bromwich Albion. He has represented England at youth level and is also eligible to represent Scotland.

Club career

Charlton Athletic
Grant was top scorer for Charlton Athletic U18s during the 2012–13 and 2013–14 seasons while still a schoolboy. Less than a week after his 17th birthday, on 23 September 2014, Grant signed a three-year contract with Charlton. He made his professional debut shortly after on 30 September 2014, as an 89th-minute substitute in a 1–0 victory against Norwich City. He later made his first start on 18 October 2014 in a 1–0 loss against AFC Bournemouth. He scored his first competitive goal for the Addicks first team in a 4–1 Football League Cup win over Dagenham & Redbridge. On 26 September, he scored his first league goal for Charlton in a 2–1 loss to Cardiff City.

Loan to Cambridge United
On 16 January 2016, Grant signed for League Two club Cambridge United on a one-month loan deal.

Loan to Crawley Town
On 30 January 2018, Grant joined Crawley Town on loan until the end of the 2017–18 season. He made an immediate impact at the West Sussex club, scoring 8 goals in his first 9 appearances for them. He made 15 appearances in total for Crawley, scoring 9 goals.

Huddersfield Town
On 30 January 2019, Grant joined Huddersfield Town for an undisclosed fee, signing a contract until the summer of 2022 with the club. He made his debut for the Yorkshire club three days later in a 5–0 away loss to Chelsea where he came on as a substitute. On 9 February 2019, Grant scored his first Huddersfield goal on his second Town appearance in a 2–1 home loss against Arsenal.

West Bromwich Albion
On 15 October 2020, West Bromwich Albion announced the signing of Grant on a six-year contract for an undisclosed fee, reported to be £15 million. On 26 October 2020, Grant scored his first league goal for Albion in a 1–1 away draw against Brighton & Hove Albion. In an EFL Cup tie, against Sheffield United, Grant was substituted on, scored the winning goal, got injured and was resubstituted 15 minutes later.

International career
In February 2014, Grant represented England U17 in the Algarve tournament. On 6 November 2014, Grant was called up to the England U18 squad for a double header against Poland. He played for England U19 in September 2015, against Croatia. Grant is also eligible to play for Scotland through his Scottish mother.

Personal life
In June 2018, whilst on holiday in Ibiza, Grant was arrested for suspicion of privacy invasion and teammate Reeco Hackett-Fairchild was arrested on suspicion of a sexual assault on a 19-year-old woman.

In the summer of 2018, he dropped the Ahearne part of his surname, to become known as Karlan Grant.

Career statistics

References

External links

Profile at the West Bromwich Albion F.C. website

1997 births
Living people
Footballers from the Royal Borough of Greenwich
English footballers
England youth international footballers
Association football forwards
Charlton Athletic F.C. players
Cambridge United F.C. players
Crawley Town F.C. players
Huddersfield Town A.F.C. players
West Bromwich Albion F.C. players
English Football League players
Premier League players
Black British sportsmen
English people of Scottish descent